Thomas Jones was the fifth intendent (mayor) of Charleston, South Carolina, serving one term from 1789 to 1790.

Jones was born on December 13, 1742. He served in the South Carolina State House, representing St. Philip's and St. Michael's Parish (i.e., the Charleston area) during five General Assemblies from 1782 to 1790. He was elected intendant in September 1789. He died October 30, 1836, and is buried in the Circular Congregational churchyard in Charleston.

References

Mayors of Charleston, South Carolina
1742 births
1826 deaths